Stanwix Station, in western Arizona, was a stop on the Butterfield Overland Mail Stagecoach line built in the later 1850s near the Gila River about  east of Yuma, Arizona. Originally the station was called Flap Jack Ranch later Grinnell's Ranch or Grinnell's Station.  In 1862, Grinnell's was listed on the itinerary of the California Column in the same place as Stanwix Ranch (or Stanwix Station) which became the site of the westernmost skirmish of the American Civil War. A traveler in 1864, John Ross Browne, wrote Grinnell's was six miles southwest of the hot springs of Agua Caliente, Arizona.

Skirmish at Stanwix Station
The westernmost skirmish of the American Civil War, which occurred at Stanwix Station, took place on March 29, 1862, when Capt. William P. Calloway and a vanguard of 272 troops from the California Column discovered a small detachment of Confederate Arizona Volunteers led by 2nd Lt. John W. Swilling burning hay, which had been placed at Stanwix Station for the California Column's animals. After a brief exchange of gun fire with the much larger Union force, the Confederates retreated to Tucson, the capital of the western district of the Confederate Territory of Arizona. The skirmish resulted in the wounding of a German-born Union private, William Frank Semmelrogge (Semmilrogge), who subsequently recovered. There appear to have been no other casualties.

The significance of the incident was twofold. First, the burning of hay, not only at Stanwix but at five other former stagecoach stations along the Gila River east of Fort Yuma, delayed the California Column's advance to Tucson and Mesilla, the territorial capital of Confederate Arizona. Before the Confederates evacuated Tucson, they also removed or destroyed the supplies gathered for the Union advance by Ammi S. White at the Maricopa Villages. Secondly, and of more immediate importance, Swilling was able to reach Tucson and warn Capt. Sherod Hunter, district military commander of western Confederate Arizona, of the approaching California Column. This led Hunter to place pickets at strategic locations, leading to the Battle of Picacho Pass, where ten Confederate pickets were attacked by a Union cavalry detachment of about twelve. This "battle" was also only a skirmish, distinguished from the Stanwix Station fight simply by the comparatively more severe casualties: three dead and three wounded Union soldiers, and three Confederates taken prisoner.

Stanwix Station
The stagecoach lines were abandoned in the 1880s when the Southern Pacific Railroad (SPRR) completed laying track to Tucson from Yuma.  The SPRR built a station just to the east of the Maricopa County line on Stanwix Flats, and called it "Stanwix Station."

See also

 La Paz Incident
 St. Albans Raid

References

Sources
 The Confederate Arizona Campaign of 1862, Col. Sherrod Hunter Camp 1525, SCV, Phoenix, Arizona.
 Hunt, Aurora, James Henry Carleton, 1814–1873, Frontier Dragoon, Frontier Military Series II, Glendale, California: Arthur H. Clark Company, 1958. (Hunt states that John Swilling led the Confederates at Picacho Pass, but this is persuasively contradicted by the other source above, who show that Swilling was actually elsewhere guarding Union prisoners at the time.)
 Masich, Andrew E., The Civil War in Arizona; the Story of the California Volunteers, 1861–65 Nornan: University of Oklahoma Press, 2006.
 
 Fort Bowie National Historic Site 
 

Stanwix
Stanwix
Stanwix
Stanwix
Butterfield Overland Mail
Stanwix
Gila River
Stagecoach stations in Arizona
History of Yuma County, Arizona
March 1862 events